

Indraff (1938–1963) was a gray Arabian stallion, foaled on May 9, 1938 and bred by Roger Selby of Ohio. His sire was Raffles and his dam was Indaia.  Both his sire and dam were bred by the Crabbet Arabian Stud in England and imported to the United States by Selby.

As a colt, before he grayed out, Indraff had a blaze and a front stocking. Indraff was sold as a young horse to Donald Schutz, who kept him as a breeding stallion for a number of years before selling him to Bazy McCormick Miller, later Bazy Tankersley of Al-Marah Arabians. Schutz used the money to begin Schutz Brothers, a business manufacturing horse equipment, ran today (the business has closed) by Schutz's son, Mitchell Schutz. Indraff was registered with the Arabian Horse Club Registry of America, the precursor to the Arabian Horse Association as number 1575.

Indraff sired 254 purebred Arabian foals, and had over 2700 grandget. He was one of the foundation sires of the Al-Marah breeding program, one of the most prolific and influential farms in United States Arabian breeding circles.

Indraff died on August 22, 1963.

Pedigree

Notes

References
 All Breed Pedigree Database Pedigree of Indraff accessed on October 18, 2007

External links
 Indraff information

1938 animal births
1963 animal deaths
Individual Arabian and part-Arabian horses